The third season of The Hills, an American reality television series, consists of 28 episodes and was broadcast on MTV. The first portion aired from August 13, 2007, until December 10, 2007, while the second portion aired from March 24, 2008, until May 12, 2008. The season was filmed from April 2007 to March 2008 in Los Angeles, California, with additional footage in Crested Butte, Colorado; Las Vegas, Nevada; and Paris, France. The executive producer was Liz Gateley.

The Hills focuses on the lives of Lauren Conrad, Audrina Patridge, Whitney Port, and Heidi Montag. During the season, Conrad ended her friendship with Montag after suspecting that she and her boyfriend Spencer Pratt fabricated rumors of a sex tape involving herself and ex-boyfriend Jason Wahler. The ensuing feud between the three became a central focus of the series, and was carried through each subsequent season. Meanwhile, Patridge resumed a relationship with her on-again/off-again boyfriend Justin Brescia.

Synopsis
Lauren's and Hedi's feud reaches an all time high. At Teen Vogue, Whitney struggled with her new position as the Direct Supervisor to the interns after a break-up with a longtime boyfriend.  and Lauren got a second chance with Lisa Love by being sent to Paris to assist with the Bal des Débutantes with Whitney by her side. After realizing that staying behind the scenes at Teen Vogue wasn't for her, Whitney got a new job working for the fashion PR firm, People's Revolution, and brought Lauren along with her. Lauren continued to stay close with her childhood friend, Lo Bosworth, and the two decided to buy a house together in Hollywood and invited Audrina to live with them, even though Lo felt uneasy about their decision. Additionally, Audrina spent more time with former flame, Justin, which made the situation in the house ever more uneasy. The two had a dramatic break-up but eventually reunited. Meanwhile, Heidi continued to climb the corporate ladder at Bolthouse Productions and struggled with her engagement to Spencer. The two went on a "relationship vacation", and Spencer consequently moved in with his sister, Stephanie, who managed to put herself in the midst of the 'Lauren vs Heidi' feud after befriending Lauren while taking a class at FIDM together. In the season finale, Heidi put her job at Bolthouse in jeopardy after going home with Spencer, who surprised her during a business trip to Las Vegas, and Audrina argued to Lauren that it was Lo who was pulling their friendship apart.

Cast

Ratings
The season premiere averaged over 3.6 million viewers, up 44% from the season two premiere. The first half of season 3 made The Hills MTV's number one show and on cable among P12-34, reaching a total of 100 million viewers both online and on television. The second half, which premiered in March, was the highest rated cable telecast of the year among P12-34, with an average of 4.7 million viewers.

Episodes

References

External links
Season 3 on MTV

3
2008 American television seasons
2007 American television seasons